Richard Behar is an American investigative journalist. Since 2012, he has been the Contributing Editor of Investigations for Forbes magazine.  From 1982 to 2004, he wrote on the staffs of Forbes, Time and Fortune.  Behar's work has also been featured on BBC, CNN, PBS, FoxNews.com and Fast Company magazine.  He coordinates Project Klebnikov, a media alliance to probe the Moscow murder of Forbes editor Paul Klebnikov. He is writing a book about Bernard Madoff. Behar is editor of Mideast Dig.

Education and career
Behar was born to a Jewish family in Manhattan and raised on Long Island. He is a 1982 graduate of New York University.  Before joining Time in 1989, he was a reporter and associate editor for Forbes magazine for six years.  He has also worked at The New York Times as a researcher and writer.  Behar reported extensively about organized crime and the business backgrounds of politicians for Time, for whom Behar wrote a 1993 cover story on the World Trade Center bombing.

In 1991, he wrote "The Thriving Cult of Greed and Power", a Time cover story on Scientology. The acclaimed article won several awards.  The Church of Scientology brought several lawsuits over the article, all of which were eventually dismissed.  While investigating the story, he experienced some of Scientology's Fair Game tactics. He later learned that a copy of his personal credit report, containing detailed personal information, had been improperly obtained.

A 2003 report by Behar in Fortune explored Donald Rumsfeld's role in helping North Korea build its potential Nuclear weapon capacity, in an article entitled "Rummy’s North Korea Connection:  What Did Donald Rumsfeld Know About ABB’s Deal to Build Nuclear Reactors There? And Why Won’t He Talk About It?" Behar is the only known journalist to have read the classified Phoenix Memo, the infamous pre-9/11 FBI document which warned the FBI about Osama bin Laden supporters enrolling in flight-training schools across the country. Reporting from Pakistan for Fortune magazine and CNN after 9-11, Behar’s “The Karachi Connection” broke ground by exposing a logistics leader of the 9-11 attacks—including his secret travels near the Afghanistan border just days before the terror attacks. A second article, "Kidnapped Nation" revealed how radical forces are undermining Pakistan's economy.

Behar and Time Inc. were sued for libel in June 2001 by the billionaire brothers David and Simon Reuben, who built one of the world's largest aluminum companies, Trans-World Group. They  claimed Behar defamed them in a 2000 Fortune article. Shortly before trial, in July 2004, the suit was settled after Fortune ran a lengthy clarification.

In October 2004, Behar left Fortune to pursue book writing and various independent projects, including the launch of Project Klebnikov, a global media alliance investigating the July 2004, murder of Paul Klebnikov, who was then the editor-in-chief of Forbes Russia.  Behar also served on the advisory committee of New York University's business journalism Master's program (BER), and has long been reporting and writing a book about Bernard Madoff, to be published by Simon & Schuster. The book was initially purchased by Random House. In 2015, Behar co-wrote an article for the New York Observer that accused the Associated Press of improperly reporting civilian deaths in the 2015 Israel-Hamas war in Gaza.

In 2015, Behar and journalist Gary Weiss co-founded The Mideast Reporter, now known as Mideast Dig, a not-for-profit news site and investigative journalism project. Its aim is to deepen news coverage of the Middle East. Weiss left the venture in November 2015.

Recognition
Behar has won more than 20 major journalism awards and honors for his reporting. Behar was included among the 100 best business journalists (the "100 luminaries") of the 20th century by the TJFR business journalism trade group.  In 1999, columnist Jack Anderson called Behar "one of the most dogged of our watchdogs."

Awards
Behar has won journalism awards, including:
Four awards in recognition of his 1991 story for Time about Scientology:
Gerald Loeb Award for distinguished business and financial journalism in a magazine(1992)
Conscience-in-Media Award from the American Society of Journalists and Authors (1992) "for singular commitment to the highest principles of journalism at notable personal cost"
Worth Bingham Prize (1992)
Cult Awareness Network's Leo J. Ryan Award
George Polk Award (twice): One for his 1995 story about the strong-arm tactics used by the Allstate Insurance Co. against its own employees; a second Polk for a 2008 story about China's activities in sub-Saharan Africa
Business Journalist of the Year Award from the City of London Corporation for articles about counterfeiting in China and organized crime in Russia's aluminum industry 
Daniel Pearl Award for post-9/11 journalism
2002 Morton Frnak Award, Overseas Press Club for post-9/11 journalism in Pakistan
2008 Ed Cunningham Award, Overseas Press Club for China's activities in sub-Saharan Africa
Jack Anderson Award (twice) for "Top Investigative Reporter of the Year" – 1997 and 1999
 National Headliner Award, as a member of the CNN Investigation Team, for "outstanding continuing coverage of attacks on America and their aftermath."
 SAPA award (Society of Publishers in Asia) for best feature writing for an in-depth account of the royal family of Brunei
 "Best of the Best" award in 2009 from the Society of American Business Editors and Writers (SABEW), for an article on China's business activities in sub-Saharan Africa.
Fortune was awarded the National Magazine Award for public interest for two articles written by Behar on organized crime's influence in the garbage-hauling industry (1997) 
2008 George Polk Award for articles in Fast Company
 In 2013, finalist for a Loeb award for a Forbes magazine article about Hess Oil's Russian mob problem.

Notes

External links

ProjectKlebnikov.org
LermaNet.com – 'Leo Award Winner Richard Behar at CAN Conference 1992'
NewsBios.com
Acceptance Speech, for Leo J. Ryan award
MediaBistro Bio

American investigative journalists
Jewish American journalists
Living people
Year of birth missing (living people)
George Polk Award recipients
Critics of Scientology
People from Levittown, New York
People from Manhattan
Writers from New York (state)
Time (magazine) people
Fortune (magazine) people
Forbes people
Journalists from New York City
American male non-fiction writers
Gerald Loeb Award winners for Magazines